Astathes nigrofasciata is a species of beetle in the family Cerambycidae. It was described by Breuning in 1956. It is known from Thailand.

References

N
Beetles described in 1956